George Clive Handford  (born 17 April 1937) is an English Anglican bishop. He was the fourth Anglican Bishop in Cyprus and the Gulf.

Early life

Handford was born on 17 April 1937. He studied at Hatfield College, Durham University, graduating with a 2:1 degree in Modern Arabic Studies. He then underwent ministerial formation at Queen's College, Edgbaston.

Religious life

Handford was made a deacon at Michaelmas in 1963 (22 September), by Morris Gelsthorpe, Assistant Bishop of Southwell, and ordained a priest at the Trinity Sunday following (24 May 1964), by Gordon Savage, Bishop of Southwell, both times at Southwell Minster;. He then began his ministry as a curate in Mansfield. He then started what was to be a long association with the Middle East by becoming a chaplain in Lebanon before Dean of St. George's Cathedral, Jerusalem.

Often embroiled in centuries old disputes, he clearly stated his own view in a letter to The Times in 1977:

Returning to England, he became Vicar of Kneesall, Archdeacon of Nottingham. Then in 1990, he was elected Bishop suffragan of Warwick and consecrated a bishop on 6 December at Westminster Abbey. He was then translated to the Mediterranean Anglican Diocese of Cyprus and the Gulf where he served the Anglican Community until retirement in 2007. During much of that time, he served as Presiding Bishop of the Episcopal Church in Jerusalem and the Middle East.

In retirement, he still maintains his links with the church and serves as an honorary assistant bishop in the Diocese of Ripon and Leeds.

References

1937 births
Alumni of Hatfield College, Durham
Archdeacons of Nottingham
Bishops of Warwick
Anglican bishops in Cyprus and the Gulf
Companions of the Order of St Michael and St George
English Anglicans
Living people
Deans of Jerusalem